Namchongang Trading Corporation() (also known as Namhung Trading Corporation or Namhung) is a North Korean "trading company subordinate to the General Bureau of Atomic Energy (GBAE)".

According to US officials, it is part of North Korea's "attempts to export its nuclear and long-range missile technologies. These include "a direct role in helping Syria start construction of a nuclear reactor near the Euphrates River that Israeli jets destroyed in 2007" and "Myanmar’s arms industry", and "importing centrifuge equipment that North Korea is using to develop a uranium-enrichment capability".

According to UN officials, it was "involved in the procurement of Japanese origin vacuum pumps that were identified at a DPRK nuclear facility, as well as nuclear-related procurement".

At one time, Yun Ho Jin, who was a former senior North Korea diplomat who served at Pyongyang's mission to the International Atomic Energy Agency, was its leader.

Its headquarters are at Chilgol, Mangyongdae District, Pyongyang, DPRK.

References

Defence companies of North Korea
North Korean entities subject to the U.S. Department of the Treasury sanctions